Beeskow station is a railway station in the municipality of Beeskow, located in the Oder-Spree district in Brandenburg, Germany.

References

Railway stations in Brandenburg
Buildings and structures in Oder-Spree